The Way Back (titled Finding the Way Back in the United Kingdom) is a 2020 American sports drama film directed by Gavin O'Connor and written by Brad Ingelsby. It stars Ben Affleck, Al Madrigal, Michaela Watkins, and Janina Gavankar, and follows an alcoholic construction worker who is recruited to become head coach of the basketball team at the high school where he was a star.

The film was theatrically released in the United States on March 6, 2020, by Warner Bros. Pictures. In response to the COVID-19 pandemic causing movie theaters across the globe to close, Warner Bros. made the film available to own digitally on March 24, 2020. The film received generally positive reviews from critics, with Affleck's performance receiving praise. However, the film suffered at the box office due to COVID-19 because it was only in theaters for two weeks.

Plot

Jack Cunningham is an alcoholic ironworker who is separated from his wife, Angela. While at Thanksgiving dinner with his family, they express concern about his habits. The next day, Jack receives a call from Father Devine at his former Catholic high school, Bishop Hayes. Devine asks him to step in as the school's basketball coach, as the previous coach has suffered a heart attack. Jack is introduced to assistant coach and algebra teacher Dan, as well as the team members. He learns that Bishop Hayes has not gone to the playoffs since he was a student, and that interest has dropped significantly, leaving the team with only six varsity players.

The team is initially annoyed by Jack's stricter practices and aggressive attitude, but soon grow to respect him. The team improves and Jack begins to bond with the players. His drinking decreases, and he spends more time with his family and friends. Jack and Angela attend a birthday party together for David, the son of their friend Miguel. It is revealed that Jack and Angela had a son, Michael, who died from cancer. David and Michael were in the hospital together; David is now in remission.

Affected by the birthday party and memories of his son, Jack protests a call at a game, which results in him being ejected. After the game, Jack reveals to one of his players that Jack's father was neglectful, only paying attention to him due to his basketball talent. As a result, Jack turned down a full athletic scholarship to the basketball program at the University of Kansas, and has not played basketball since.

The team's final game of the season is a rematch with Memorial, the top-ranked team. Bishop Hayes completes the victory to clinch a playoff berth. Later, Jack receives a call from Angela, telling him David has been hospitalized. While visiting, they overhear a doctor informing David's parents his cancer has returned. The sight of their grief disturbs Jack, who leaves the hospital and begins drinking again.

The following morning, Jack arrives to practice late and drunk; Dan informs Father Devine, who fires Jack, telling him he is unable to trust him with the team. This causes Jack to spiral further. One night, while driving drunk with a woman he met at a bar, Jack rear-ends a boat hitched to a parked car. The woman flees, telling him to enter her house through the back, but Jack enters the wrong house and is confronted by its occupant. Jack attempts to leave before the police arrive, but the confrontation becomes physical, causing him to fall and be knocked unconscious.

Jack awakens in the hospital where he is met by his sister, who demands that he get help for his alcoholism. Jack begins to attend therapy and starts to open up about his son's death. He meets with Angela and apologizes for his past mistakes. The team dedicates their first playoff game to Jack. Meanwhile, at an outdoor court, Jack picks up a basketball and practices shooting.

Cast

 Ben Affleck as Jack Cunningham
 Al Madrigal as Dan
 Michaela Watkins as Beth
 Janina Gavankar as Angela
 Glynn Turman as Doc
 John Aylward as Father Edward Devine
 Todd Stashwick as Kurt
 Brandon Wilson as Brandon Durrett
 Charles Lott Jr. as Chubbs Hendricks
 Will Ropp as Kenny Dawes
 Hayes MacArthur as Eric
 Jeremy Ratchford as Matty
 T. K. Carter as Russ Durrett
 Da'Vinchi as Devon Childress
 Rachael Carpani as Diane
 Marlene Forte as Gale
 Melvin Gregg as Marcus Parrish
 Chris Bruno as Sal DeSanto
 Dan Lauria as Gerry Norris

Production 
On June 11, 2018, it was announced that director Gavin O'Connor and actor Ben Affleck were going to re-team on a Warner Bros. drama film, titled The Has-Been, scripted by Brad Ingelsby about a former basketball star who has lost his wife and family foundation because of an addiction, and he attempts to regain his soul by becoming the coach of a high school basketball team at his alma mater. On September 26, 2018, it was reported that comedian Al Madrigal had joined the cast of the film, now known as Torrance, to play Dan, a well mannered high school mathematics teacher and the school's assistant coach who believes in Affleck's character after the head coach quits. Producers would be Jennifer Todd, Gordon Gray, Ravi Mehta, and O'Connor. In October 2018, Janina Gavankar joined the cast of the film. In November 2018, Brandon Wilson and Rachael Carpani joined the cast of the film. In July 2019, it was announced the title of the film was The Way Back. In August 2019, it was announced Rob Simonsen would score the film. Affleck spoke on how the film acted as a form of therapy for him following his own stints with alcoholism and rehab.

Filming
Principal photography began in October 2018 around the San Pedro and Long Beach neighborhood of Los Angeles. Much of the interior shots were filmed in the Chaffey High School gym in Ontario, California.

Release
The film was originally scheduled to be released on October 18, 2019. However, in March 2019, it was pushed back several months to March 6, 2020.

On March 19, Warner Bros. Pictures announced that the film would be available digitally in the United States and Canada through Premium VOD on March 24 due to movie theaters closures because of the COVID-19 pandemic restrictions. This was just two weeks after the film's theatrical debut and before the end of the usual 90-day theatrical run. Another film distributed by the studio, Birds of Prey and the Fantabulous Emancipation of One Harley Quinn, was also released earlier than expected for the same reason. The film was released on Blu-ray, and DVD on May 19, 2020.

Reception

Box office
The Way Back grossed $13.6 million in the United States and Canada, and $1.9 million in other territories, for a worldwide total of $15.5 million, against a production budget of $21–25 million.

In the United States and Canada, the film was released alongside Onward and the wide expansion of Emma, and was projected to gross $7–10 million from 2,718 theaters in its opening weekend. It made $2.6 million on its first day. The film went on to debut to $8.5 million, finishing third at the box office. The film fell 70% in its second weekend to $2.4 million, finishing seventh, largely caused by the COVID-19 pandemic in the United States.

Critical response
The website's critics consensus reads: "The Way Backs occasionally frustrating treatment of a formulaic story is often outweighed by Ben Affleck's outstanding work in the central role." On Metacritic, the film has a weighted average score of 66 out of 100, based on 40 critics, indicating "generally favorable reviews." Audiences polled by CinemaScore gave the film an average grade of "B+" on an A+ to F scale, and PostTrak reported it received an average 3.5 out of 5 stars from viewers they polled, with 54% saying they would definitely recommend it.

Todd McCarthy of The Hollywood Reporter wrote: "Affleck gives the impression of intimate familiarity with the anguish and self-disgust that dominate Jack's life; this character and project clearly meant something important to him, as the title bluntly suggests, and he gives it his all without overdoing the melodrama." Owen Gleiberman of Variety said that "Ben Affleck is compelling in a drama of addiction and redemption that plays off his own tabloid odyssey. But the tabloid version was better."

References

External links 
 
 
 

2020 films
2020 drama films
2020s English-language films
2020s high school films
2020s sports drama films
American basketball films
American high school films
American sports drama films
Bron Studios films
Films about alcoholism
Films directed by Gavin O'Connor
Films scored by Rob Simonsen
Films set in California
Films shot in Los Angeles
Films with screenplays by Brad Ingelsby
Pearl Street Films films
Teen sports films
Warner Bros. films
2020s American films
English-language sports drama films